Tvoje lice zvuči poznato is the Croatian version of Your Face Sounds Familiar. The fourth season will start in later 2017. There are four judges in season three, Goran Navojec (actor), Sandra Bagarić (opera singer), Tomo in der Mühlen (music producer & DJ) and different guest judges in every episode.

Format
The show challenges celebrities (singers and actors) to perform as different iconic music artists every week, which are chosen by the show's "Randomiser". They are then judged by the panel of celebrity judges including Goran Navojec, Sandra Bagarić and Tomo in der Mühlen. Every week, one celebrity guest judge joins Goran, Sandra and Tomo to make up the complete judging panel. In the Final of the fourth season, Sandra didn't vote, so there were two guest members of the jury - Indira Levak and Mario Petreković. Each celebrity gets transformed into a different singer every week, and performs an iconic song and dance routine well known by that particular singer. The Randomiser can choose any older or younger artist available in the machine, even a singer of the opposite sex, or a deceased singer. In third season (Week 3), ability to use a joker was introduced. If celebrity wasn't happy with the Randomiser's output or thought that the task is too hard, they could ask some other celebrity to perform instead of them, but just once per season. It was announced that the show will get even more new content in the fourth season, but the 'Joker' ability was removed. The new content in the fourth season was the introduction of holographic performances. If the "Randomiser" chooses a celebrity should perform a duet, they can do it using the pre-recorded hologram for one of the given singers. The winner of every episode gets to donate 10 000 HRK, while the overall leader gets to donate 40 000 HRK at the end of the season. The show lasts for 13 weeks.

Voting
The contestants are awarded points from the judges (and each other) based on their singing and dance routines. Judges award from 4 to 12 - excluding 11 - points to each contestant. After that, each contestant gives 5 points to a fellow contestant of their choice (known as "Bonus" points). In week 12 (semi-final week), four contestants with the highest number of votes will qualify to the final. In week 13 (grand final), previous points will be transformed into a 4-7 system, the jury will award from 8 to 12 points, and contestants will give 5 points to a fellow contestant of their choice.

Judges
Tomo in der Mühlen - German-born music producer and DJ based in New York City and Zagreb.
Goran Navojec - Croatian actor, known for many roles on television series and in feature films.
Sandra Bagarić - Bosnian opera singer also active in Croatia (didn't judge in the Final)

Guest member

Damir Kedžo (Week 1)
Jelena Rozga (Week 2)
Bojana Gregorić Vejzović (Week 3)
Jacques Houdek (Week 4)
Lana Jurčević (Week 5)
Baby Dooks (Week 6)
Mia Kovačić (Week 7)
Zorica Kondža (Week 8)
Matteo Cetinski (Week 9)
Ivanka Mazurkijević (Week 10)
Marko Tolja (Week 11)
Irina Čulinović (Week 12)
Indira Levak and Mario Petreković (Week 13 - Final)

Contestants

Color key:
 indicates the winning contestant that week
 indicates the contestant with fewest points that week
 indicates the series winner
 indicates the series runner-up

Week 1
Guest Judge: Damir Kedžo  Aired: March 5, 2017  Winner: Mario Roth

Opening act
Damir Kedžo - Not A Crime
Bonus points
Nives gave five points to Dalibor
Ivana gave five points to Dalibor
Bojan gave five points to Dalibor
Mia gave five points to Mario
Ana gave five points to Mario
Mario gave five points to Daniel
Daniel gave five points to Mario
Dalibor gave five points to Mario

Week 2
Guest Judge: Jelena Rozga  Aired: March 12, 2017  Winner: Ivana Mišerić

Opening act
Jelena Rozga - Žileti
Bonus points
Dalibor gave five points to Ivana
Mario gave five points to Mia
Mia gave five points to Ivana
Ivana gave five points to Nives
Ana gave five points to Nives
Bojan gave five points to Ivana
Nives gave five points to Ivana
Daniel gave five points to Ivana

Week 3
Guest Judge: Bojana Gregorić Vejzović Aired: March 19, 2017  Winner: Mia Anočić Valentić

Bonus points
Daniel gave five points to Mia
Ivana gave five points to Daniel
Mario gave five points to Dalibor
Bojan gave five points to Mia
Dalibor gave five points to Mia
Ana gave five points to Daniel
Mia gave five points to Daniel
Nives gave five points to Mia

Week 4
Guest Judge: Jacques Houdek  Aired: March 26, 2017  Winner: Bojan Jambrošić

Opening act
Jacques Houdek - Kad nekoga voliš
Bonus points
Mario gave five points to Bojan
Nives gave five points to Daniel
Ana gave five points to Bojan
Ivana gave five points to Bojan
Daniel gave five points to Bojan
Dalibor gave five points to Bojan
Mia gave five points to Bojan
Bojan gave five points to Nives

Week 5
Guest Judge: Lana Jurčević  Aired: April 2, 2017  Winner: Ana Gruica

Opening act
Lana Jurčević - Šećeru
Bonus points
Ana gave five points to Dalibor
Dalibor gave five points to Ana
Mia gave five points to Ana
Ivana gave five points to Ana
Bojan gave five points to Ana
Daniel gave five points to Ana
Nives gave five points to Ana
Mario gave five points to Ana

Week 6
Guest Judge: Baby Dooks (David Vurdelja)  Aired: April 9, 2017  Winner: Ivana Mišerić

Bonus points
Dalibor gave five points to Daniel
Ivana gave five points to Mia
Mia gave five points to Nives
Bojan gave five points to Daniel
Mario gave five points to Nives
Nives gave five points to Bojan
Ana gave five points to Ivana
Daniel gave five points to Dalibor

Week 7
Guest Judge: Mia Kovačić  Aired: April 16, 2017  Winner: Dalibor Petko

Bonus points
Ana gave five points to Mia
Daniel gave five points to Bojan
Ivana gave five points to Mario
Bojan gave five points to Dalibor
Dalibor gave five points to Nives
Nives gave five points to Mario
Mia gave five points to Dalibor
Mario gave five points to Ivana

Week 8
Guest Judge: Zorica Kondža   Aired: April 23, 2017  Winner: Nives Celzijus

Bonus points
Mia gave five points to Nives
Bojan gave five points to Nives
Daniel gave five points to Dalibor
Ana gave five points to Daniel
Mario gave five points to Nives
Nives gave five points to Dalibor
Ivana gave five points to Nives
Dalibor gave five points to Nives

Week 9
Guest Judge: Matteo Cetinski    Aired: April 30, 2017  Winner: Mia Anočić-Valentić

Bonus points
Dalibor gave five points to Mia
Nives gave five points to Mia
Ana gave five points to Bojan
Mario gave five points to Mia
Daniel gave five points to Mia
Bojan gave five points to Ana
Mia gave five points to Bojan
Ivana gave five points to Mia

Week 10
Guest Judge: Ivanka Mazurkijević  Aired: May 7, 2017  Winner: Mia Anočić-Valentić

Bonus points
Mia gave five points to Dalibor
Nives gave five points to Dalibor
Ivana gave five points to Dalibor
Mario gave five points to Dalibor
Dalibor gave five points to Ivana
Bojan gave five points to Mia
Ana gave five points to Mia
Daniel gave five points to Ana

Week 11
Guest Judge: Marko Tolja  Aired: May 14, 2017  Winner: Mario Roth

Bonus points
Mia gave five points to Daniel
Bojan gave five points to Daniel
Ana gave five points to Daniel
Nives gave five points to Mario
Daniel gave five points to Mario
Dalibor gave five points to Mario
Ivana gave five points to Daniel
Mario gave five points to Daniel

Week 12
Guest Judge: Irina Čulinović  Aired: May 21, 2017  Winner: Bojan Jambrošić

Bonus points
Mia gave five points to Bojan
Daniel gave five points to Bojan
Ana gave five points to Bojan
Mario gave five points to Nives
Nives gave five points to Dalibor
Dalibor gave five points to Nives
Bojan gave five points to Dalibor
Ivana gave five points to Dalibor

Week 13 - Final
Guest Judges: Indira Levak and Mario Petreković  Aired: May 28, 2017  Winner: Nives Celzijus

Opening act
Colonia - "Lei lei"
Interval act

 
Bonus points
Mario gave five points to Nives
Bojan gave five points to Mia
Nives gave five points to Mia
Mia gave five points to Bojan
Dalibor gave five points to Nives
Ivana gave five points to Nives
Ana gave five points to Bojan
Daniel gave five points to Bojan

See also
Tvoje lice zvuči poznato (Croatian TV series)
Tvoje lice zvuči poznato (Croatian season 1)
Tvoje lice zvuči poznato (Croatian season 2)
Tvoje lice zvuči poznato (Croatian season 3)
Tvoje lice zvuči poznato (Croatian season 5)

References

Croatia
2017 Croatian television seasons